Albert K. Cohen (June 15, 1918 – November 25, 2014) was a prominent American criminologist. He is known for his Subcultural Theory of delinquent urban gangs, including his influential book Delinquent Boys: Culture of the Gang. He has served as Vice President of the American Society of Criminology from 1984–1985 and in 1993 he received the society's Edwin H. Sutherland award.

Work
Albert Cohen was a student of Talcott Parsons and wrote a Ph.D. under his inspiration. Parsons and Cohen continued to correspond also after Cohen left Harvard. In his 1955 work, Delinquent Boys: The Culture of the Gang, Cohen wrote about delinquent gangs and suggested in his theoretical discussion how such gangs attempted to "replace" society's common norms and values with their own sub-cultures. He proposed two basic ideologies, the first of which is called status frustration.

Status frustration is directed mainly to the young people of lower classes. There is no parallel between their own social realities and the rest of society's promoted goals. They become frustrated at the disadvantages and inequalities that they face, and this leads to Cohen's second principle; reaction formation.

Reaction formation is the reaction from status frustration, and the young men of the lower classes find themselves replacing their society's norms and values with alternative ones. I.e. instead of working hard being the common goal for respect, it may become a delinquent act like who commits the most vandalism to gain the respect. This provides the group with a sense of values and status which they cannot receive from the larger society. It is a process which allows the members of the groups to adapt to their own exclusion from society. Unlike Merton's strain theory, Cohen holds the view that the reaction to status frustration is a collective response rather than an individual one.

This theory accounts for the increasing rates of non-utilitarian crime (vandalism, loitering and joyriding) in western societies. Although actions such as these do not provide monetary gain to the perpetrator, they come to hold value to members of the sub-culture. As such, becoming accessible means of achieving status and prestige among the individual's peer group.

Personal history
Albert Cohen graduated from Harvard University with honors in sociology in 1948.

References

American criminologists
1918 births
Harvard University alumni
2014 deaths